David Whatton QPM is a retired British senior police officer. He was the Chief Constable of Cheshire Constabulary in Cheshire, England. He has previously held chief police officer roles with the West Midlands Police and Greater Manchester Police.

Career
David Whatton joined the West Midlands Police in April 1983. In December 2002 he joined Greater Manchester Police from the West Midlands Police as Assistant Chief Constable and became Deputy Chief Constable.

He assumed the role of Acting Chief Constable for GMP after the death of Michael J. Todd, the chief constable who died in Snowdonia on 11 March 2008.

In October 2008 it was announced Whatton was to become the new Chief Constable of Cheshire Constabulary when the previous incumbent, Peter Fahy, became the new Chief Constable of GMP.  He took up the role officially on 1 December 2008. In January 2010 he was awarded the Queen's Police Medal.

During his time as Chief Constable of Cheshire Constabulary, Whatton served as the National Policing Lead for Violence and public Protection for the College of Policing and Association of Chief Police Officers (ACPO).

Whatton retired from the police in June 2014. He was succeeded by the then Metropolitan Police Assistant Commissioner Simon Byrne who was unanimously approved to be Cheshire's next Chief Constable in February 2014.

Personal life
Mr Whatton is married and has three teenage children.

Honours

References

Year of birth missing (living people)
Living people
British Chief Constables
West Midlands Police
English recipients of the Queen's Police Medal